Nueplex Cinemas is a movie theatre and the largest Cinema Complex located in Karachi, Pakistan. Housed on the second floor of The Place, built from the ground up and designed by cinema Architects Mesbur & Smith of Canada. Comprising 5 theatres, totalling 1200 seats and home to the 3 largest silver screens in Pakistan.

References

External links 
 
 
 Nueplex Cinemas on Google Maps

Categories
Cinemas and movie theatres in Pakistan
2013 establishments in Pakistan
Entertainment in Karachi